Gremlin Island is a small rocky island which lies close northwest of the tip of Red Rock Ridge, off the west coast of Graham Land, Antarctica. It was first surveyed in 1936 by the British Graham Land Expedition under Rymill. The island was used as a site for a depot by the Falkland Islands Dependencies Survey (FIDS) in 1948–49, and was so named by them because of the mysterious disappearance of a ration box left there by a FIDS sledging party.

See also 
 List of Antarctic and sub-Antarctic islands

References

Islands of Graham Land
Fallières Coast